Augustalis (Latin for "imperial, belonging to/representing the Augustus"), may refer to:

 Augustalis, a medieval coin
 the day of the Augustalia
 those who led the first ranks of an army
 certain Roman magistrates in cities
 any one of the officers of the Emperor's palace
 one of the priests who oversaw the games performed in honor of Augustus; see Sodales Augustales
 flamen Augustalis, the flamen of the deified Augustus
 Praefectus augustalis, the governor of Egypt
 Threnodia Augustalis, a poem by John Dryden on the death of Charles II
 Liber Augustalis, or the Constitutions of Melfi
 Augustalis (bishop), the first bishop of Toulon, according to some sources, and possibly also the author of a tract calculating the date of Easter
 Mermessus augustalis, a species of spider in the genus Mermessus